Lapino is a rural locality (a selo) in Pochepsky District, Bryansk Oblast, Russia. The population was 158 as of 2010. There are 7 streets.

Geography 
Lapino is located 33 km southwest of Pochep (the district's administrative centre) by road. Pukosino and Krasnoznamensky are the nearest rural localities.

References 

Rural localities in Pochepsky District